is a 2012 Japanese drama film written and directed by  Takashi Yamazaki, based on the manga Sunset on Third Street by Ryōhei Saigan. It is a sequel to Always: Sunset on Third Street 2 (2007). The film was released on 21 January 2012.

Always: Sunset on Third Street '64 is set in Tokyo at the time of the 1964 Tokyo Olympics.

Cast
 Hidetaka Yoshioka
 Koyuki
 Shinichi Tsutsumi
 Hiroko Yakushimaru
 Kenta Suga
 Kazuki Koshimizu
 Maki Horikita
 Masako Motai

References

External links
  

2012 films
2012 3D films
Japanese 3D films
Live-action films based on manga
Films directed by Takashi Yamazaki
Films set in Tokyo
Films set in 1964
Sunset on Third Street
Films scored by Naoki Satō
2010s Japanese films